Kugelblitz may refer to:
Kugelblitz (armoured fighting vehicle), a German self-propelled anti-aircraft gun used in World War II
Kugelblitz (astrophysics), a concentration of light so intense that it forms an event horizon and becomes self-trapped
Operation Kugelblitz, a 1943 anti-Partisan offensive in Yugoslavia
Aílton (footballer, born 1973), nickname for athlete Aílton Gonçalves da Silva